The women's 3000 metres steeplechase event at the 2010 World Junior Championships in Athletics was held in Monction Stadium (now Croix-Bleue Medavie Stadium) in Moncton, New Brunswick, Canada, on 20 and 22 July.

Medalists

Results

Final
22 July

Heats
20 July

Heat 1

Heat 2

Participation
According to an unofficial count, 26 athletes from 19 countries participated in the event.

References

3000 metres steeplechasechase
Steeplechase at the World Athletics U20 Championships
2010 in women's athletics